In geometry, a parallelogon is a polygon with parallel opposite sides (hence the name) that can tile a plane by translation (rotation is not permitted).

Parallelogons have an even number of sides and opposite sides that are equal in length. A less obvious corollary is that parallelogons can only have either four or six sides;  Parallelogons have 180-degree rotational symmetry around the center.

A four-sided parallelogon is called a parallelogram.

The faces of a parallelohedron (the three dimensional analogue) are called parallelogons.

Two polygonal types 
Quadrilateral and hexagonal parallelogons each have varied geometric symmetric forms. They all have central inversion symmetry, order 2. Every convex parallelogon is a zonogon, but hexagonal parallelogons enable the possibility of nonconvex polygons.

Geometric variations
A parallelogram can tile the plane as a distorted square tiling while a hexagonal parallelogon can tile the plane as a distorted regular hexagonal tiling.

References

 The facts on file: Geometry handbook, Catherine A. Gorini, 2003, p.117
  list of 107 isohedral tilings, p.473-481

External links
 Fedorov's Five Parallelohedra

Types of polygons